The 1997 Navy Midshipmen football team represented the United States Naval Academy (USNA) as an independent during the 1997 NCAA Division I-A football season. The team was led by third-year head coach Charlie Weatherbie.

Schedule

Roster

Game summaries

Army

References

Navy
Navy Midshipmen football seasons
Navy Midshipmen football